Pinch & Shackleton is a 2011 album by Pinch and Shackleton.

Critical reception

At Metacritic, which assigns a normalised rating out of 100 to reviews from mainstream critics, Pinch & Shackleton received an average score of 84, based on 7 reviews, indicating "universal acclaim".

Track listing
 "Cracks in the Pleasuredome" – 6:29
 "Jellybones" – 5:22
 "Torn and Submerged" – 6:30
 "Rooms Within a Room" – 5:21
 "Selfish Greedy Life" – 5:28
 "Burning Blood" – 7:11
 "Levitation" – 6:44
 "Monks on the Rum / Boracay Drift" – 14:03

References

External links
 Pinch & Shackleton at the official Honest Jon's Records website
 

2011 albums
Honest Jon's Records albums